

Station List

Ka

Ke

Ki

Ko

Ku - Ky

L

K